The Fibonacci word fractal is a fractal curve defined on the plane from the Fibonacci word.

Definition 

This curve is built iteratively by applying the Odd–Even Drawing rule to the Fibonacci word 0100101001001...:

For each digit at position k:
 Draw a segment forward
 If the digit is 0:
 Turn 90° to the left if k is even
 Turn 90° to the right if k is odd
To a Fibonacci word of length  (the nth Fibonacci number) is associated a curve  made of  segments. The curve displays three different aspects whether n is in the form 3k, 3k + 1, or 3k + 2.

Properties 

Some of the Fibonacci word fractal's properties include:
 The curve  contains  segments,  right angles and  flat angles.
 The curve never self-intersects and does not contain double points. At the limit, it contains an infinity of points asymptotically close.
 The curve presents self-similarities at all scales. This number, also called the silver ratio, is present in a great number of properties listed below.
 The number of self-similarities at level n is a Fibonacci number \ −1..
 The curve encloses an infinity of square structures of decreasing sizes in a ratio  (see figure). The number of those square structures is a Fibonacci number.
 The curve can also be constructed in different ways (see gallery below):
 Iterated function system  of 4 and 1 homothety of ratio  and 
 By joining together the curves  and 
 Lindenmayer system 
 By an iterated construction of 8 square patterns around each square pattern.
 By an iterated construction of octagons 
 Exchanging the roles of "0" and "1" in the Fibonacci word, or in the drawing rule yields a similar curve, but oriented 45°.
 From the Fibonacci word, one can define the «dense Fibonacci word», on an alphabet of 3 letters: 102210221102110211022102211021102110221022102211021... . The usage, on this word, of a more simple drawing rule, defines an infinite set of variants of the curve, among which:
 a "diagonal variant"
 a "svastika variant"
 a "compact variant"
 It is conjectured that the Fibonacci word fractal appears for every sturmian word for which the slope, written in continued fraction expansion, ends with an infinite sequence of "1"s.

Gallery

The Fibonacci tile 

The juxtaposition of four  curves allows the construction of a closed curve enclosing a surface whose area is not null. This curve is called a "Fibonacci tile".
 The Fibonacci tile almost tiles the plane. The juxtaposition of 4 tiles (see illustration) leaves at the center a free square whose area tends to zero as k tends to infinity. At the limit, the infinite Fibonacci tile tiles the plane.

Fibonacci snowflake 

The Fibonacci snowflake is a Fibonacci tile defined by:
  if 
  otherwise.

Several remarkable properties:
 It is the Fibonacci tile associated to the "diagonal variant" previously defined.
 It tiles the plane at any order.
 It tiles the plane by translation in two different ways. 
 its perimeter at order n equals , where  is the nth Fibonacci number. 
 its area at order n follows the successive indexes of odd row of the Pell sequence (defined by ).

See also 
 Golden ratio
 Fibonacci number
 Fibonacci word
 List of fractals by Hausdorff dimension

References

External links 
"Generate a Fibonacci word fractal", OnlineMathTools.com.

Fractals
Fractal curves